Kirill Mikhaylov (born April 2, 1983) is a Russian cross-country skier, biathlete, and four-time Paralympic Champion. He competed in classification category standing events.

Mikhaylov competed in cross-country skiing at the 2006 Winter Paralympics. He took the gold in the men's 20 km and the bronze in the men's 10 km, standing. He placed 5th in the men's relay with Alfis Makamedinov and Vladimir Kiselev, and 4th in the men's 5 km, standing.

Mikhaylov competed at the 2010 Winter Paralympics in cross-country skiing and biathlon. In cross-country skiing, he took the gold in the men's 1x4/2x5 km relay together with Sergey Shilov, Nikolay Polukhin and guide Andrey Tokarev, and in the 20 km, standing. He took the silver in the 1 km sprint and the 10 km, standing. In biathlon, he took the gold medal in the men's 3 km pursuit, standing. He placed 4th in the 12.5 km individual, standing.

References

External links
 

Russian male cross-country skiers
Russian male biathletes
Paralympic biathletes of Russia
Paralympic cross-country skiers of Russia
Biathletes at the 2006 Winter Paralympics
Cross-country skiers at the 2006 Winter Paralympics
Biathletes at the 2010 Winter Paralympics
Cross-country skiers at the 2010 Winter Paralympics
Paralympic gold medalists for Russia
Paralympic silver medalists for Russia
Paralympic bronze medalists for Russia
1983 births
Living people
Biathletes at the 2014 Winter Paralympics
Medalists at the 2006 Winter Paralympics
Medalists at the 2010 Winter Paralympics
Medalists at the 2014 Winter Paralympics
Paralympic medalists in cross-country skiing
Paralympic medalists in biathlon